Yang Ching-sung (born 5 June 1942) is a Taiwanese sports shooter. He competed in the mixed skeet event at the 1984 Summer Olympics.

References

1942 births
Living people
Taiwanese male sport shooters
Olympic shooters of Taiwan
Shooters at the 1984 Summer Olympics
Place of birth missing (living people)
20th-century Taiwanese people